Eitan Zemel is the Vice Dean for Strategic Initiatives and the W. Edwards Deming Professor of Quality and Productivity at New York University's Stern School of Business.  He also teaches courses in operations management and operations strategy at NYU. Professor Zemel also teaches for the Master of Science in Business Analytics Program for Executives (MSBA), which is jointly hosted by NYU Stern and NYU Shanghai.

Academic interests
Zemel's research is focused on computations and algorithms.  He developed the concepts used in the first practical algorithm for solving large knapsack problems and which are used in almost every efficient algorithm for this type of problem.

Other areas of Zemel's research include supply chain management, operations strategy, service operations, and incentive issues in operations management.  His writing has appeared in numerous publications including The SIAM Journal on Applied Mathematics, Operations Research, Games and Economic Behavior, and Annals of Operations Research.

Zemel is also an associate editor of Manufacturing Review, Production and Operations Management, and Management Science, and the senior editor of Manufacturing and Service Operations.

Books

Publications
Eitan Zemel is a co-author of over 40 articles.

Education
Zemel received his Bachelor of Science in Mathematics from the Hebrew University of Jerusalem, his Master of Science in Applied Physics from The Weizmann Institute of Science in Israel, and his Doctor of Philosophy in Operations Research from the Graduate School of Business Administration at Carnegie Mellon University.

References

External links
Department of Operations Management website
List of Publications
List of Publications Part II
NYU Stern Biography
Department of Operations Management Biography

Year of birth missing (living people)
Living people
New York University Stern School of Business faculty
Tepper School of Business alumni